Vincent Peranio (born 1945) is a retired American production designer, art director, set designer, and actor.

Peranio began his career designing film sets for John Waters.  Because of his work with Waters, he is considered one of the Dreamlanders, Waters' ensemble of regular cast and crew members.

Biography 
Peranio was born in 1945 in Baltimore, and received a Master of Fine Arts degree from the Maryland Institute College of Art in 1968. He is of Italian ancestry. 

Peranio's first credited project is the creation of Lobstora, a room-sized rapacious lobster in Waters' Multiple Maniacs (1970).

After Multiple Maniacs, Peranio developed a successful career creating the sets for all subsequent films of Waters and other films and TV shows, including Barry Levinson's Liberty Heights and the crime dramas, 
Homicide: Life on the Street, The Corner, and the HBO television production The Wire.

At times, Peranio's brother Ed Peranio assisted with prop construction and creating effects, as well as portraying minor roles in the early Waters films.

Peranio retired in 2016.

Personal life
Peranio and his wife, designer Dolores Deluxe, moved to Tavira, Portugal, in 2019. They had previously lived on Dallas Street in Fell's Point, Baltimore, where they gradually bought four adjoining rowhomes and merged them, modeling the property after an Italian villa, which was eventually dubbed the "Palace on Dallas".

Filmography

Cinema

Production design
Multiple Maniacs (1970) (designer of Lobstora)
Pink Flamingos (1972) (also Set Design/Art Direction/Technical Assistant)
Female Trouble (1974) (also Art Direction)
Desperate Living (1977) (as Set Designer)
The Hitter (1979) (as Set Designer)
Polyester (1981)
Hairspray (1988) (also Art Direction)
Cry-Baby (1990)
Serial Mom (1994)
Pecker (1998)
Liberty Heights (1999)
Cecil B. DeMented (2000)
Book of Shadows: Blair Witch 2 (2000)
Replay (2003)
A Dirty Shame (2004)
This Filthy World (2006)
Bay of Pigs (2008)

Art direction
The Prize Fighter (1979)
The Private Eyes (1980)
Ruckus (1981)
The House on Sorority Row (1983)
The Adventure of the Action Hunters (1987)

Actor
Multiple Maniacs (1970) as Freak
Pink Flamingos (1972) as Musician at Party
Love Letter to Edie (1975) as Sailor in Bar
The Adventure of the Action Hunters (1987) as 1st

Television production design
Darrow (1991)
Homicide: Life on the Street (84 episodes from 1993–1999)
The Corner (2000)
Young Americans (2000)  (unknown episodes)
Shot in the Heart (2001)
The Wire (51 episodes from 2002–2008)
Something the Lord Made (2004)

Other
Edith's Shopping Bag (1976) (Himself)
The Bedroom Window (1987) (set buyer: Baltimore)
Divine Trash (1998) (himself)
Anatomy of a 'Homicide: Life on the Street' (1998) (as himself)
It Came from Baltimore (2005) (Himself)
All the Dirt on 'A Dirty Shame' (2005) (Himself)
The Wire: It's All Connected (2006) (Himself)
The Roots of 'Hairspray' (2007) (Himself)

References

External links 
 
 Dreamland Website
 Baltimore's Setting Son: Interview with Vincent Peranio at Citypaper Online
 New York Times Filmography
 Interview from the Preparation of ''Fell's Point Out of Time

1945 births
20th-century American artists
20th-century American male actors
21st-century American artists
American art directors
American expatriates in Portugal
American production designers
American people of Italian descent
Artists from Baltimore
Living people
Male actors from Baltimore
Maryland Institute College of Art alumni
People from Tavira